Young Man of Manhattan is a 1930 American pre-Code musical comedy film directed by Monta Bell and starring Claudette Colbert, Norman Foster, Ginger Rogers, and Charles Ruggles. Made by Paramount Pictures, it was set and filmed in New York City.

Plot
Jealousy comes between a young couple of newspaper people when the wife earns more money and becomes more famous than her husband. Especially his alcohol addiction becomes the dividing element, whereas the young Puff Randolph girl chasing him, and her editor falling in love with her are merely elements that challenge their love.

Cast
Claudette Colbert as Ann Vaughn
Norman Foster as Toby McLean
Ginger Rogers as Puff Randolph
Charles Ruggles as Shorty Ross
Leslie Austin as Dwight Knowles
Lorraine, Aileene, Fern, and Harriet Aalbu as the Sherman Sisters (credited as Four Aalbu Sisters)
H. Dudley Hawley as Doctor
Jack Dempsey as Jack Dempsey (archive footage) (uncredited)
Maynard Holmes as Football Game Spectator (uncredited)
John MacDowell as Undetermined Role (uncredited)
Tom Reilly as Referee (archive footage) (uncredited)
Gene Tunney as Gene Tunney (archive footage) (uncredited)

References

External links

1930 films
1930 romantic comedy films
American romantic comedy films
American romantic musical films
American black-and-white films
Films based on American novels
Films based on romance novels
Films directed by Monta Bell
Films set in New York City
Paramount Pictures films
Films about alcoholism
Gender equality
Films about journalists
1930 musical comedy films
1930s romantic musical films
1930s American films